Ramularia menthicola is a fungal plant pathogen infecting mint.

References

Fungal plant pathogens and diseases
Mint diseases
menthicola
Fungi described in 1886